is the debut single of Japanese singer Ai Otsuka, released on September 10, 2003 in CD-only format, then on October 1, 2003 in CD+DVD format. The title track was used as the theme song of the NTV drama Suika. The two versions charted separately; the CD-only edition peaked 24th on the Oricon weekly singles chart and charted for twenty-one weeks while the CD+DVD edition peaked at the 86th position and charted for seventeen weeks.

Track listing

Sales
Initial week (est.): 6,848 (CD); 760 (CD+DVD)
Total (est.): 31,091 (CD); 13,731 (CD+DVD); 44,822 (all)

References

Ai Otsuka songs
2003 singles
Japanese television drama theme songs
Songs written by Ai Otsuka
2003 songs
Avex Trax singles
Songs about flowers